The Baltic Jazz festival is one of the summer's highlights in the archipelago of Turku, Finland. It all started in 1987 when some Jazz-music enthusiasts in the small village Dalsbruk (fin. Taalintehdas) arranged a small local festival. By the late 1990s the festival had grown to be one of the biggest jazz festivals in Finland. It takes place two weeks after midsummer, usually the second weekend in July.

Music festivals established in 1987
Jazz festivals in Finland
Summer events in Finland